The Rothenburg Solar Park is a photovoltaic power station in Rothenburg, Oberlausitz in Germany. Initially it had a capacity of 20.5 megawatts (MW).  The solar park is equipped with 273,240  CdTe-modules from First Solar, and 11 Siemens central inverters. The project was commissioned in 2009. The original solar farm was divided into three fields on the airfield site.

In September 2012, the three existing plants were supplemented by a fourth with a rated capacity of 15.2 MWp. As a result, the solar park now has a total capacity of 37 MWp. Unlike the first three plants, the fourth uses solar modules from Yingli and BYD.

See also

Photovoltaic power stations

References

Photovoltaic power stations in Germany
Economy of Saxony
2009 establishments in Germany
Buildings and structures in Görlitz (district)